Callitrichia is a genus of dwarf spiders that was first described by L. Fage in 1936.

Species
 it contains fifty-six species:

Callitrichia aberdarensis (Holm, 1962) – Kenya
Callitrichia afromontana Scharff, 1990 – Tanzania
Callitrichia aliena Holm, 1962 – Algeria, Cameroon, Kenya
Callitrichia cacuminata Holm, 1962 – Kenya, Uganda
Callitrichia casta (Jocqué & Scharff, 1986) – Tanzania
Callitrichia celans (Gao, Xing & Zhu, 1996) – China
Callitrichia concolor (Caporiacco, 1949) – Kenya
Callitrichia convector (Tanasevitch, 2014) – Thailand
Callitrichia crinigera Scharff, 1990 – Tanzania
Callitrichia cypericola (Jocqué, 1981) – Malawi
Callitrichia galeata (Jocqué & Scharff, 1986) – Tanzania
Callitrichia glabriceps Holm, 1962 – Kenya, Uganda
Callitrichia gloriosa (Jocqué, 1984) – South Africa
Callitrichia hamifera Fage, 1936 (type) – Kenya, Uganda
Callitrichia hirsuta Lin, Lopardo & Uhl, 2022 – Tanzania
Callitrichia holmi (Wunderlich, 1978) – Tanzania
Callitrichia inacuminata Bosmans, 1977 – Kenya
Callitrichia incerta Miller, 1970 – Angola
Callitrichia infecta (Jocqué & Scharff, 1986) – Tanzania
Callitrichia insulana (Scharff, 1990) – Tanzania
Callitrichia juguma (Scharff, 1990) – Tanzania
Callitrichia kenyae Fage, 1936 – Kenya
Callitrichia latitibialis (Bosmans, 1988) – Cameroon
Callitrichia legrandi (Jocqué, 1985) – Comoros
Callitrichia longiducta (Bosmans, 1988) – Guinea, Cameroon
Callitrichia macrophthalma (Locket & Russell-Smith, 1980) – Nigeria, Ivory Coast
Callitrichia marakweti Fage, 1936 – Kenya
Callitrichia meruensis Holm, 1962 – Tanzania
Callitrichia minuta (Jocqué, 1984) – South Africa
Callitrichia mira (Jocqué & Scharff, 1986) – Tanzania
Callitrichia monoceros (Miller, 1970) – Angola
Callitrichia monticola (Tullgren, 1910) – Tanzania
Callitrichia muscicola (Bosmans, 1988) – Cameroon
Callitrichia obtusifrons Miller, 1970 – Angola
Callitrichia paludicola Holm, 1962 – Tanzania
Callitrichia paralegrandi (Tanasevitch, 2016) – India (Himalaya)
Callitrichia perspicua (Scharff, 1990) – Tanzania
Callitrichia picta (Caporiacco, 1949) – DR Congo, Kenya
Callitrichia pileata (Jocqué & Scharff, 1986) – Tanzania
Callitrichia pilosa (Wunderlich, 1978) – Ethiopia
Callitrichia revelatrix (Jocqué & Scharff, 1986) – Tanzania
Callitrichia rostrata (Jocqué & Scharff, 1986) – Tanzania
Callitrichia ruwenzoriensis Holm, 1962 – Uganda
Callitrichia sellafrontis Scharff, 1990 – Tanzania
Callitrichia silvatica Holm, 1962 – Kenya, Uganda, Malawi
Callitrichia summicola (Jocqué & Scharff, 1986) – Tanzania
Callitrichia superciliosa (Jocqué, 1981) – Malawi
Callitrichia taeniata Holm, 1968 – Tanzania
Callitrichia telekii (Holm, 1962) – Kenya
Callitrichia trituberculata (Bosmans, 1988) – Cameroon
Callitrichia truncatula (Scharff, 1990) – Tanzania
Callitrichia turrita Holm, 1962 – Tanzania
Callitrichia uncata (Jocqué & Scharff, 1986) – Tanzania
Callitrichia usitata (Jocqué & Scharff, 1986) – Tanzania
Callitrichia virgo (Jocqué & Scharff, 1986) – Tanzania

See also
 List of Linyphiidae species

References

Araneomorphae genera
Linyphiidae
Spiders of Africa
Spiders of Asia